KQ-X was a $33 million DARPA program awarded to Northrop Grumman on July 1, 2010. KQ-X investigated and developed autonomous aerial refueling techniques using two NASA Global Hawk high-altitude long endurance (HALE) unmanned aerial vehicles (UAVs).

History
Northrop Grumman retrofitted two of the HALE UAVs so that one aircraft can pump fuel into the other while in flight via a hose-and-drogue refueling system. Several aspects of the KQ-X program were considered revolutionary: not only would the aerial refueling be autonomous, but since Global Hawks are classified as HALE UAVs, the refueling tests would occur at an altitude higher than that typically performed using manned aircraft. The tests would also be the first time that HALE UAVs have been flown in formation.

Engineering work was completed at the Northrop Grumman Unmanned Systems Development Center in Rancho Bernardo, California. Pilots from NASA, NOAA, and Northrop Grumman flew the Global Hawks from the NASA Armstrong Flight Research Center at Edwards Air Force Base, also in California. Sargent Fletcher Inc. and Sierra Nevada Corporation were major KQ-X subcontractors.

Flight demonstrations occurred from January 11 to May 30, 2012. In a departure from traditional refueling methods, the tanker is fitted with a refueling probe on the nose, which trails behind the receiving aircraft equipped with a hose-drum unit under the fuselage, plugging into the drogue and pushing the fuel upwards. Autonomous aerial refueling was expected to extend the Global Hawk's endurance from 30–35 hours to 120–125 hours, set by payload reliability more than engine oil consumption.

The KQ-X program ended in September 2012 without airborne fuel transfer occurring between the two UAVs. The two Global Hawks used in demonstrations were owned by NASA and jointly operated with Northrop Grumman. NASA required the two planes for atmospheric science missions in June 2012 after flight control testing and had to de-modify and reconfigure them to perform hurricane tracking flights after that. Further tests could have been performed, but NASA halted the use of the Global Hawks that June after a Navy operated version crashed. Data from the flights were put into virtual simulations that concluded 60 percent of autonomous refueling attempts would result in contact between the refueling probe and receiver drogue. Further unmanned refueling tests were carried out under the Unmanned Combat Air System Demonstrator program with software from the Northrop Grumman X-47B UAV.

See also
 Unmanned Carrier-Launched Airborne Surveillance and Strike
 CBARS

References

Unmanned aerial vehicles of the United States
NASA programs
DARPA
Air refueling
Northrop Grumman aircraft